The 2022–23 Swiss Women's Super League (referred to as the Axa Women's Super League for sponsoring reasons) is the 53nd season of top-tier competitive women's football in Switzerland.

Format
In the regular season, the eight teams of the 2021–22 Playoffs joined by the two winners of relegation/promotion playoff, Yverdon and Rapperswil-Jona. At the end of the first phase, the eight top teams advance to the playoffs. The bottom two teams are joined by the top two teams of the Nationalliga B in the relegation playoff. The regular season starts on 20 August 2022 and ends on 22 April 2023. Playoff schedule and bracket will be drawn following conclusion of the regular season. 

The winner of the playoffs is crowned Swiss Champion. The champion and the winner of the regular season qualify to the UEFA Champions League.

The top two teams of the Relegation Playoff are qualified for the 2023–24 Swiss Women's Super League, the bottom two are relegated to 2023-24 Nationalliga B.

Teams

Regular Season

References

External links
 Official Website

2022-23
Swiss
2022–23 in Swiss football